Damien Fotiou is an Australian actor who is probably best known for his roles in the television series Kick and Thunderstone. His is also notable for his film roles in Head On and Kangaroo Jack.

Early life
Damien is a 1994 graduate of the Victorian College of the Arts and teacher and co-owner of "Brave Studios" and "Greentree Acting School" in Footscray, Victoria.

Career
Fotiou has joined the cast of Neighbours as Nick Petrides. He made his first screen appearance in 2015.

In 2021, Fotiou later recurred in the TV series La Brea as Judah.

Filmography

References

External links
 

Living people
Year of birth missing (living people)
Australian male film actors
Australian male television actors
Australian people of Greek descent